Madecassina is a genus of beetles in the family Carabidae, containing the following species:

 Madecassina alluaudi Jeannel, 1949 
 Madecassina angusticollis (Alluaud, 1899) 
 Madecassina curta (Alluaud, 1935) 
 Madecassina maculata (Alluaud, 1899) 
 Madecassina occipitalis Jeannel, 1949 
 Madecassina permira (Alluaud, 1935) 
 Madecassina picta (Alluaud, 1897) 
 Madecassina puncticollis Jeannel, 1949 
 Madecassina sicardi Jeannel, 1949 
 Madecassina tanala (Alluaud, 1935)

References

Lebiinae